Jack Carter (born Jack Chakrin; June 24, 1922 – June 28, 2015) was an American comedian, actor, and television presenter. Brooklyn-born, Carter had a long-running comedy act similar to fellow rapid-paced contemporaries Milton Berle and Morey Amsterdam.

Life and career
Carter was born in Brighton Beach, Brooklyn, New York, in 1922 to a Jewish family. Carter served in the United States Army Air Forces during World War II. He hosted an early television variety program called Cavalcade of Stars on the DuMont Network. He was lured to NBC to host his own program titled The Jack Carter Show. Carter recommended Jackie Gleason take his place as host of Cavalcade of Stars, though DuMont did not hire Gleason until the network's choice, Jerry Lester, also jumped to NBC. The Jack Carter Show appeared under the banner of the Saturday Night Revue, NBC's -hour Saturday night programming slot. Carter hosted his show for one hour each week followed by the 90-minute Your Show of Shows starring Sid Caesar, Imogene Coca, Carl Reiner, and Howard Morris. Carter remained friends with Sid Caesar his entire life and delivered the eulogy at his funeral.

His only major Broadway appearance was opposite Sammy Davis Jr. in the 1956 musical Mr. Wonderful. He earlier replaced Phil Silvers in the Broadway show Top Banana. He was a frequent guest on The Ed Sullivan Show during the 1960s and early 1970s, and was known for his impression of Ed Sullivan. He appeared as himself (along with his then-wife Paula Stewart) in the comedy series The Joey Bishop Show. In the late 1960s, he was the host of a game-show pilot called Second Guessers. The pilot did not sell. He was also a frequent panelist on the television game show Match Game during the 1973–1974 season and again during the early 1980s. In 1975, he appeared as a guest star on the quiz show $10,000 Pyramid with contestant Liz Hogan Schultz, and appeared as the ill-fated mayor in the cult horror film Alligator in 1980.

Starting in the 1970s, Carter was on more than ten Dean Martin Celebrity Roasts for some popular television stars and sports personalities.

In 1981, he starred as Fagin in the stage performance of Oliver! at the Birmingham Theater in (Birmingham, Michigan) alongside Shani Wallis as Nancy.

He made appearances on many television series, including Diagnosis: Unknown, The Dick Van Dyke Show, Combat!, The Love Boat, Mr. Smith Goes to Washington, The Rockford Files, Cannon, The Wild Wild West, Tales of Tomorrow, The Kallikaks, Password, $weepstake$, The Ren & Stimpy Show, 7th Heaven, Diagnosis Murder, The Road West, Sanford and Son, Tattletales, Monk, Rules of Engagement, Living Single, iCarly, Desperate Housewives, and Shameless and voice work on King of the Hill. His last round of work included a cameo on New Girl and a voice on Family Guy. He was a guest on Norm Macdonald's video podcast, Norm Macdonald Live, in 2014.

Carter died on June 28, 2015, four days after his 93rd birthday, at his home in Beverly Hills, California, of respiratory failure.

See also

 The King of Queens, Carter played Arthur Spooner in the sitcom's pilot, but was later replaced by Jerry Stiller.

Selected filmography

It Happened to Jane (1959) - Stenographer (uncredited)
The Horizontal Lieutenant (1962) - Lt. Billy Monk
Viva Las Vegas (1964) - Casino Performer (uncredited)
The Extraordinary Seaman (1969) - Chief Gunners Mate Orville Toole
The Resurrection of Zachary Wheeler (1971) - Dwight Chiles
Hustle (1975) - Herbie Dalitz
Won Ton Ton, the Dog Who Saved Hollywood (1976) - Male Journalist
The Amazing Dobermans (1976) - Solly Kramer
The Happy Hooker Goes to Washington (1977) - Senator Caruso
Record City (1978) - Manny
The Glove (1979) - Walter Stratton
Alligator (1980) - Mayor
The Octagon (1980) - Sharkey
Separate Ways (1981) - Barney Brodsky
History of the World, Part I (1981) - Rat Vendor (The French Revolution)
Heartbeeps (1981) - Catskil (voice)
The Funny Farm (1983) - Philly Beekman
Hambone and Hillie (1983) - Lester Burns
Love Scenes (1984) - Sidney
The Trouble with Dick (1986) - Samsa
W.A.R.: Women Against Rape (1987) - Frank Bower
Arena (1989) - Announcer
Satan's Princess (1990) - Old Priest
Cyber-C.H.I.C. (1990) - Dr. Burburagmus
Caged Fury (1990) - Mr. Castaglia
Sexpot (1990) - Cal Farnsworth
In the Heat of Passion (1992) - Stan 
The Opposite Sex and How to Live with Them (1992) - Rabbi
Burke's Law (1994) - Danny Duke
Prima Donnas (1995) - Sen. Robertson
Living Single (1996) - Ray
The Good Bad Guy (1997) - Honda Civic driver
Always Say Goodbye (1997) - Jerry Feldman
October 22 (1998) - Pawnbroker
The Modern Adventures of Tom Sawyer (1998) - Young Guy
Play It to the Bone (1999) - Dante Solomon
One Last Ride (2004) - Sid
Cougar Club (2007) - Party Guest - Stan's Friend
The Great Buck Howard (2008) - Himself
Let Go (2011) - Frosty
Mercy (2014) - Mr. Bello (final film role)

References

External links

Jack Carter interview, April 2011, Part One 
Jack Carter interview, April 2011, Part Two 
Jack Carter interview, June 2011, Part Three
Jack Carter interview, June 2011, Part Four
Jack Carter on The Tonight Show with Jerry Lewis, 1962

1922 births
2015 deaths
People from Brighton Beach
Male actors from New York City
Jewish American comedians
American male radio actors
American male film actors
American male television actors
Jewish American male actors
Male actors from Los Angeles
Deaths from respiratory failure
United States Army Air Forces personnel of World War II
Jewish American military personnel
United States Army Air Forces soldiers
Comedians from California
Comedians from New York City
20th-century American comedians
21st-century American comedians
21st-century American Jews